The Berlin Tapes is a soundtrack album, credited to Australian rock musician Iva Davies and Icehouse. The record was a collaboration between Davies and classical music composer Max Lambert to accompany the Sydney Dance Company's production of the ballet Berlin, for which Icehouse performed live on stage. 

The covers are mostly acoustic, with piano, strings and subtle electronica incorporated into most tracks. The record was initially released as a single or double disc set, with the second disc consisting of instrumental Icehouse tracks performed with the ballet. 

A 1996 Japanese re-release included three bonus tracks; a 2002 digitally remastered version with five bonus tracks was released in Australia – this time credited simply to Icehouse. 

At the ARIA Music Awards of 1996, the album was nominated for Best Original Soundtrack, Cast or Show Album.

Track listing

Australian 1995 release
 "Loving the Alien" (David Bowie) – 5:34
 "Sister Europe" (The Psychedelic Furs) – 3:59
 "Heaven" (Talking Heads) – 4:27
 "Complicated Game" (XTC) – 5:27
 "Berlin" (Lou Reed) – 0:49
 "All the Way" (Frank Sinatra) – 3:16
 "All Tomorrow's Parties" (The Velvet Underground) – 4:35
 "Let There Be Love" (Simple Minds) – 4:33
 "Disappointed" (Public Image Ltd) – 5:26
 "A Really Good Time" (Roxy Music) – 3:23
 "At Night" (The Cure) – 3:57
 "Love Like Blood" (Killing Joke) – 5:47
 "Heroes" (David Bowie) – 4:29

Australian 2CD (bonus disc)
 "Dedicated to Glam"
 "Melt Steel Part 1"
 "Orbital Line"
 "Melt Steel Part 2"
 "Pas de Trois" – 4:46
 "Giant and Child Fugue" – 2:15
 "Melt Steel Part 3"
 "Crazy (Midnight Mix)"

Japanese 1996 release
Track listing for 1-13 is identical to single CD issue.

Australian 2002 reissue
Track listing for 1-13 is identical to original single CD issue. 

Notes
Tracks 14-16 originally appeared on the Japanese issue of The Berlin Tapes.
Tracks 17-18 originally appeared on the second 2-CD issue of The Berlin Tapes.

Australian 2012 reissue
This version adds the additional tracks from the 2002 reissue (minus Being Boiled), plus the Athens Mix of Heroes from the 2004 release of the same name.

Track listing for 1-13 is identical to original single CD issue.

Personnel
Adapted from AllMusic.
Greg Barrett – photography
Cover photo of Katherine Griffiths, Sydney Dance Company
Don Bartley – mastering
Steve Bull – bass guitar
David Chapman – arranger, programming, engineer
Iva Davies – guitar (acoustic), bass, keyboards, programming, vocals, engineer, digital remastering (2002),
Bruce Elder – liner notes
Simon Leadley – engineer
Ryan Scott – digital remastering (2002 version)
Adrian Wallis – cello
Paul Wheeler – drums

Charts

References

Icehouse (band) albums
1995 soundtrack albums
Theatre soundtracks